Inni í Dal, roughly translated to "In the Valley", is a location on the island of Sandoy, The Faroe Islands. Inni í Dal is the home ground of local football team B71, but also the location the joint public secondary school of Sandoy, Sandoyar Meginskúli.

History

Construction

Since the municipalities on the island of Sandoy had begun construction of a new public school for the whole island and newly founded B71 needed a football-pitch, it seemed almost natural that the building of the school and football pitch would coincide. Both were constructed and ready for use in 1971.

The school and the pitch

There is somewhat of a unique link between school and team on Sandoy. Nowhere else on The Faroe Islands does a school share in the expenses of the local football-team, lease property out for free, while at the same time not sharing in the financial profits.
Nonetheless, this has been the case since the founding of both school and team and there is a standing agreement that B71 uses both ground, changing-rooms and other facilities for free.

Expansions

Although not remarkable, there have been some adding-ons to the B71 facilities.
 Shop, open on match-day
 Various renovations regarding safety
 Renovation of technical areas
 Accommodation for television equipment
 Completion of seated area

Future and expansions

The completion of the 300-seat area in 2010 meant that one of the mandatory requirements set by UEFA had been met. The mandatory requirement for the next season was the complete renovation of the aging football pitch and other minor modifications to the ground, should B71 wish to play in the top league in 2011. Another mandatory requirement was subsequently met, when the artificial turf on the football pitch was replaced in time for the 2011 season.

Also in 2011, work started on building the new indoor sports hall, which was ready to use in November 2012.

The Sandoyartunnilin under construction from Gamlarætt on Streymoy emerges at Traðardalur, near the Inni í Dal stadium.

References

Football venues in the Faroe Islands
Sports venues completed in 1970